Stefaneschi is an Italian surname. Notable people with the surname include:

Giovanni Battista Stefaneschi (1582–1659), Italian Baroque painter
Giacomo Gaetani Stefaneschi ( 1270–1343), Italian Roman Catholic cardinal deacon

Italian-language surnames
Patronymic surnames
Surnames from given names